The 2013–14 Detroit Pistons season was the 73rd season of the franchise, the 66th in the National Basketball Association (NBA), and the 57th in the Detroit suburban area.

In the off-season, the Pistons hired former player Maurice Cheeks as their head coach as well re-acquiring former Finals MVP Chauncey Billups. John Loyer replaced Cheeks mid-season.

Following the season, Billups retired and Joe Dumars left his position as General Manager after 15 seasons.

Key dates
June 27: The 2013 NBA draft took place at the Barclays Center in Brooklyn, New York.
July 1: 2013 NBA Free Agency begins.

Draft picks

 Pick acquired from the Los Angeles Clippers on February 16, 2009 in exchange for Detroit's 2011 second round pick and Alex Acker.

Roster

Pre-season

|- style="background:#cfc;"
| 1 
| October 8
| Maccabi Haifa
| 
| Andre Drummond (17)
| Andre Drummond (9)
| Greg Monroe (4)
| Palace of Auburn Hills7,513
| 1–0
|- style="background:#fcc;"
| 2 
| October 10
| Miami
| 
| Will Bynum (28)
| Jonas Jerebko (12)
| Will Bynum (6)
| Palace of Auburn Hills17,219
| 1–1
|- style="background:#cfc;"
| 3 
| October 12
| @ Brooklyn
| 
| Andre Drummond (15)
| Tony Mitchell (10)
| Will Bynum (11)
| Barclays Center16,331
| 2–1
|- style="background:#fcc;"
| 4 
| October 16
| @ Chicago
| 
| Kentavious Caldwell-Pope (18)
| Andre Drummond (10)
| Peyton Siva (9)
| United Center21,405
| 2–2
|- style="background:#fcc;"
| 5 
| October 17
| @ Cleveland
| 
| Greg Monroe (16)
| Andre Drummond (11)
| Peyton Siva (5)
| Quicken Loans Arena12,679
| 2–3
|- style="background:#fcc;"
| 6 
| October 20
| @ Orlando
| 
| Greg Monroe (19)
| Andre Drummond (15)
| Peyton Siva (7)
| Amway Center12,967
| 2–4
|- style="background:#cfc;"
| 7 
| October 22
| Washington
| 
| Greg Monroe (18)
| Andre Drummond (14)
| Will Bynum (9)
| Palace of Auburn Hills9,219
| 3–4
|- style="background:#cfc;"
| 8 
| October 24
| Minnesota
| 
| Josh Smith (20)
| Andre Drummond (20)
| Will Bynum (9)
| Palace of Auburn Hills10,107
| 4–4

Regular season

Game log

|- style="background:#cfc;"
| 1 
| October 30
| Washington
| 
| Greg Monroe (24)
| Greg Monroe (16)
| Smith, Billups, Bynum (5)
| Palace of Auburn Hills19,258
| 1–0

|- style="background:#fcc;"
| 2 
| November 1
| @ Memphis
| 
| Smith & Stuckey (19)
| Andre Drummond (16)
| Billups & Bynum (6)
| FedExForum18,119
| 1–1
|- style="background:#cfc;"
| 3 
| November 3
| Boston
| 
| Smith, Monroe, Drummond (15)
| Andre Drummond (12)
| Bynum & Jennings (4)
| Palace of Auburn Hills14,978
| 2–1
|- style="background:#fcc;"
| 4 
| November 5
| Indiana
| 
| Brandon Jennings (17)
| Greg Monroe (10)
| Brandon Jennings (6)
| Palace of Auburn Hills13,401
| 2–2
|- style="background:#fcc;"
| 5 
| November 8
| Oklahoma City
| 
| Josh Smith (25)
| Greg Monroe (15)
| Brandon Jennings (11)
| Palace of Auburn Hills15,624
| 2–3
|- style="background:#fcc;"
| 6 
| November 11
| @ Portland
| 
| Brandon Jennings (28)
| Andre Drummond (16)
| Will Bynum (6)
| Moda Center18,834
| 2–4
|- style="background:#fcc;"
| 7 
| November 12
| @ Golden State
| 
| Andre Drummond (16)
| Andre Drummond (14)
| Will Bynum (4)
| Oracle Arena19,596
| 2–5
|- style="background:#cfc;"
| 8 
| November 15
| @ Sacramento
| 
| Josh Smith (21)
| Andre Drummond (18)
| Brandon Jennings (9)
| Sleep Train Arena17,317
| 3–5
|- style="background:#fcc;"
| 9 
| November 17
| @ L.A. Lakers
| 
| Brandon Jennings (23)
| Andre Drummond (13)
| Brandon Jennings (14)
| Staples Center18,997
| 3–6
|- style="background:#cfc;"
| 10 
| November 19
| New York
| 
| Rodney Stuckey (21)
| Drummond & Monroe (11)
| Brandon Jennings (7)
| Palace of Auburn Hills13,213
| 4–6
|- style="background:#fcc;"
| 11 
| November 20
| @ Atlanta
| 
| Brandon Jennings (21)
| Andre Drummond (12)
| Brandon Jennings (6)
| Philips Arena13,167
| 4–7
|- style="background:#fcc;"
| 12 
| November 22
| Atlanta
| 
| Kyle Singler (22)
| Andre Drummond (16)
| Brandon Jennings (14)
| Palace of Auburn Hills13,467
| 4–8
|- style="background:#cfc;"
| 13 
| November 24
| @ Brooklyn
| 
| Rodney Stuckey (27)
| Greg Monroe (11)
| Brandon Jennings (10)
| Barclays Center17,732
| 5–8
|- style="background:#cfc;"
| 14 
| November 25
| Milwaukee
| 
| Rodney Stuckey (17)
| Andre Drummond (8)
| Brandon Jennings (13)
| Palace of Auburn Hills12,150
| 6–8
|- style="background:#fcc;"
| 15 
| November 27
| Chicago
| 
| Rodney Stuckey (25)
| Drummond & Smith (11)
| Brandon Jennings (4)
| Palace of Auburn Hills14,228
| 6–9
|- style="background:#fcc;"
| 16 
| November 29
| L.A. Lakers
| 
| Rodney Stuckey (22)
| Josh Smith (19)
| Josh Smith (8)
| Palace of Auburn Hills15,202
| 6–10

|- style="background:#cfc;"
| 17 
| December 1
| Philadelphia
| 
| Andre Drummond (31)
| Andre Drummond (19)
| Brandon Jennings (12)
| Palace of Auburn Hills14,107
| 7–10
|- style="background:#cfc;"
| 18 
| December 3
| @ Miami
| 
| Kyle Singler (18)
| Andre Drummond (18)
| Monroe & Jennings (5)
| American Airlines Arena19,741
| 8–10
|- style="background:#cfc;"
| 19 
| December 4
| @ Milwaukee
| 
| Andre Drummond (24)
| Andre Drummond (19)
| Brandon Jennings (11)
| BMO Harris Bradley Center12,835
| 9–10
|- style="background:#cfc;"
| 20 
| December 7
| @ Chicago
| 
| Brandon Jennings (33)
| Andre Drummond (14)
| Brandon Jennings (5)
| United Center21,737
| 10–10
|- style="background:#fcc;"
| 21 
| December 8
| Miami
| 
| Drummond & Jennings (19)
| Andre Drummond (14)
| Brandon Jennings (6)
| Palace of Auburn Hills18,034
| 10–11
|- style="background:#fcc;"
| 22 
| December 10
| Minnesota
| 
| Brandon Jennings (20)
| Andre Drummond (8)
| Brandon Jennings (7)
| Palace of Auburn Hills11,251
| 10–12
|- style="background:#fcc;"
| 23 
| December 11
| @ New Orleans
| 
| Greg Monroe (28)
| Andre Drummond (11)
| Jennings & Stuckey (4)
| New Orleans Arena14,517
| 10–13
|- style="background:#cfc;"
| 24 
| December 13
| Brooklyn
| 
| Monroe & Drummond (22)
| Andre Drummond (13)
| Josh Smith (6)
| Palace of Auburn Hills15,159
| 11–13
|- style="background:#fcc;"
| 25 
| December 15
| Portland
| 
| Josh Smith (31)
| Andre Drummond (14)
| Brandon Jennings (10)
| Palace of Auburn Hills13,003
| 11–14
|- style="background:#cfc;"
| 26 
| December 16
| @ Indiana
| 
| Josh Smith (30)
| Greg Monroe (12)
| Brandon Jennings (8)
| Bankers Life Fieldhouse15,443
| 12–14
|- style="background:#cfc;"
| 27 
| December 18
| @ Boston
| 
| Brandon Jennings (28)
| Andre Drummond (16)
| Brandon Jennings (14)
| TD Garden17,101
| 13–14
|- style="background:#fcc;"
| 28 
| December 20
| Charlotte
| 
| Brandon Jennings (26)
| Andre Drummond (15)
| Brandon Jennings (5)
| Palace of Auburn Hills12,453
| 13–15
|- style="background:#fcc;"
| 29 
| December 21
| Houston
| 
| Josh Smith (19)
| Greg Monroe (11)
| Brandon Jennings (10)
| Palace of Auburn Hills14,606
| 13–16
|- style="background:#cfc;"
| 30 
| December 23
| @ Cleveland
| 
| Josh Smith (25)
| Monroe & Drummond (11)
| Brandon Jennings (13)
| Quicken Loans Arena19,215
| 14–16
|- style="background:#fcc;"
| 31 
| December 27
| @ Orlando
| 
| Brandon Jennings (21)
| Andre Drummond (11)
| Brandon Jennings (8)
| Amway Center16,464
| 14–17
|- style="background:#fcc;"
| 32 
| December 28
| @ Washington
| 
| Greg Monroe (14)
| Monroe & Drummond (7)
| Brandon Jennings (6)
| Verizon Center19,336
| 14–18
|- style="background:#fcc;"
| 33 
| December 30
| Washington
| 
| Greg Monroe (22)
| Andre Drummond (16)
| Brandon Jennings (14)
| Palace of Auburn Hills15,050
| 14–19

|- style="background:#fcc;"
| 34 
| January 5
| Memphis
| 
| Greg Monroe (19)
| Andre Drummond (14)
| Brandon Jennings (11)
| Palace of Auburn Hills14,134
| 14–20
|- style="background:#fcc;"
| 35 
| January 7
| @ New York
| 
| Josh Smith (21)
| Andre Drummond (17)
| Jennings & Smith (5)
| Madison Square Garden19,812
| 14–21
|- style="background:#fcc;"
| 36 
| January 8
| @ Toronto
| 
| Brandon Jennings (22)
| Andre Drummond (16)
| Brandon Jennings (9)
| Air Canada Centre16,194
| 14–22
|- style="background:#cfc;"
| 37 
| January 10
| @ Philadelphia
| 
| Josh Smith (22)
| Josh Smith (13)
| Josh Smith (7)
| Wells Fargo Center13,742
| 15–22
|- style="background:#cfc;"
| 38 
| January 11
| Phoenix
| 
| Josh Smith (25)
| Andre Drummond (13)
| Brandon Jennings (18)
| Palace of Auburn Hills15,224
| 16–22
|- style="background:#fcc;"
| 39 
| January 17
| Utah
| 
| Rodney Stuckey (21)
| Andre Drummond (13)
| Brandon Jennings (6)
| Palace of Auburn Hills18,528
| 16–23
|- style="background:#cfc;"
| 40 
| January 18
| @ Washington
| 
| Josh Smith (22)
| Andre Drummond (13)
| Brandon Jennings (8)
| Verizon Center17,039
| 17–23
|- style="background:#fcc;"
| 41 
| January 20
| L.A. Clippers
| 
| Rodney Stuckey (29)
| Andre Drummond (11)
| Brandon Jennings (6)
| Palace of Auburn Hills17,417
| 17–24
|- style="background:#fcc;"
| 42 
| January 22
| @ Milwaukee
| 
| Brandon Jennings (30)
| Andre Drummond (12)
| Josh Smith (6)
| BMO Harris Bradley Center11,266
| 17–25
|- style="background:#fcc;"
| 43 
| January 24
| New Orleans
| 
| Brandon Jennings (28)
| Andre Drummond (20)
| Brandon Jennings (7)
| Palace of Auburn Hills14,107
| 17–26
|- style="background:#fcc;"
| 44 
| January 26
| @ Dallas
| 
| Brandon Jennings (26)
| Greg Monroe (9)
| Brandon Jennings (7)
| American Airlines Center19,662
| 17–27
|- style="background:#cfc;"
| 45 
| January 28
| Orlando
| 
| Brandon Jennings (20)
| Andre Drummond (17)
| Brandon Jennings (8)
| Palace of Auburn Hills11,534
| 18–27
|- style="background:#ccc;"
| –
| January 29
| @ Atlanta
| colspan="6" | Game postponed due to severe weather conditions.

|- style="background:#cfc;"
| 46
| February 1
| Philadelphia
| 
| Andre Drummond (22)
| Andre Drummond (14)
| Josh Smith (7)
| Palace of Auburn Hills16,649
| 19–27
|- style="background:#fcc;"
| 47
| February 3
| @ Miami
| 
| Brandon Jennings (26)
| Andre Drummond (12)
| Brandon Jennings (7)
| American Airlines Arena19,802
| 19–28
|- style="background:#fcc;"
| 48 
| February 5
| @ Orlando
| 
| Josh Smith (25)
| Andre Drummond (14)
| Brandon Jennings (10)
| Amway Center15,166
| 19–29
|- style="background:#cfc;"
| 49
| February 7
| Brooklyn
| 
| Brandon Jennings (26)
| Andre Drummond (22)
| Brandon Jennings (9)
| Palace of Auburn Hills13,727
| 20–29
|- style="background:#cfc;"
| 50
| February 8
| Denver
| 
| Brandon Jennings (35)
| Andre Drummond (15)
| Brandon Jennings (12)
| Palace of Auburn Hills15,870
| 21–29
|- style="background:#cfc;"
| 51 
| February 10
| San Antonio
| 
| Brandon Jennings (21)
| Greg Monroe (10)
| Brandon Jennings (6)
| Palace of Auburn Hills13,628
| 22–29
|- style="background:#fcc;"
| 52 
| February 12
| Cleveland
| 
| Josh Smith (18)
| Andre Drummond (17)
| Jennings & Monroe (5)
| Palace of Auburn Hills13,184
| 22–30
|- align="center"
|colspan="9" bgcolor="#bbcaff"|All-Star Break
|- style="background:#fcc;"
| 53 
| February 18
| Charlotte
| 
| Brandon Jennings (24)
| Andre Drummond (22)
| Brandon Jennings (7)
| Palace of Auburn Hills11,285
| 22–31
|- style="background:#fcc;"
| 54 
| February 19
| @ Charlotte
| 
| Brandon Jennings (20)
| Greg Monroe (7)
| Will Bynum (8)
| Time Warner Cable Arena14,400
| 22–32
|- style="background:#cfc;"
| 55 
| February 21
| Atlanta
| 
| Greg Monroe (22)
| Greg Monroe (15)
| Brandon Jennings (14)
| Palace of Auburn Hills18,053
| 23–32
|- style="background:#fcc;"
| 56 
| February 22
| Dallas
| 
| Josh Smith (32)
| Greg Monroe (17)
| Will Bynum (8)
| Palace of Auburn Hills15,213
| 23–33
|- style="background:#fcc;"
| 57 
| February 24
| Golden State
| 
| Greg Monroe (23)
| Josh Smith (11)
| Brandon Jennings (10)
| Palace of Auburn Hills14,071
| 23–34
|- style="background:#fcc;"
| 58 
| February 26
| @ San Antonio
| 
| Josh Smith (24)
| Andre Drummond (17)
| Will Bynum (9)
| AT&T Center18,581
| 23–35

|- style="background:#fcc;"
| 59
| March 1
| @ Houston
| 
| Rodney Stuckey (23)
| Andre Drummond (17)
| Brandon Jennings (8)
| Toyota Center18,330
| 23–36
|- style="background:#cfc;"
| 60 
| March 3
| New York
| 
| Andre Drummond (17)
| Andre Drummond (26)
| Brandon Jennings (11)
| Palace of Auburn Hills14,742
| 24–36
|- style="background:#fcc;"
| 61 
| March 5
| Chicago
| 
| Greg Monroe (27)
| Josh Smith (9)
| Brandon Jennings (9)
| Palace of Auburn Hills14,007
| 24–37
|- style="background:#fcc;"
| 62 
| March 7
| @ Minnesota
| 
| Greg Monroe (20)
| Greg Monroe (15)
| Brandon Jennings (5)
| Target Center16,242
| 24–38
|- style="background:#fcc;"
| 63
| March 9
| @ Boston
| 
| Josh Smith (28)
| Andre Drummond (22)
| Brandon Jennings (7)
| TD Garden18,624
| 24–39
|- style="background:#cfc;"
| 64 
| March 11
| Sacramento
| 
| Josh Smith (24)
| Greg Monroe (12)
| Will Bynum (7)
| Palace of Auburn Hills15,234
| 25–39
|- style="background:#fcc;"
| 65
| March 12
| @ Toronto
| 
| Brandon Jennings (24)
| Greg Monroe (10)
| Will Bynum (7)
| Air Canada Centre18,247
| 25–40
|- style="background:#fcc;"
| 66
| March 15
| Indiana
| 
| Josh Smith (23)
| Greg Monroe (13)
| Brandon Jennings (12)
| Palace of Auburn Hills17,440
| 25–41
|- style="background:#fcc;"
| 67 
| March 19
| @ Denver
| 
| Greg Monroe (22)
| Kentavious Caldwell-Pope (10)
| Will Bynum (10)
| Pepsi Center16,671
| 25–42
|- style="background:#fcc;"
| 68 
| March 21
| @ Phoenix
| 
| Rodney Stuckey (23)
| Andre Drummond (16)
| Will Bynum (9)
| US Airways Center18,422
| 25–43
|- style="background:#fcc;"
| 69
| March 22
| @ L.A. Clippers
| 
| Jonas Jerebko (22)
| Andre Drummond (12)
| Will Bynum (10)
| Staples Center19,214
| 25–44
|- style="background:#cfc;"
| 70
| March 24
| @ Utah
| 
| Drummond & Stuckey (19)
| Andre Drummond (14)
| Will Bynum (9)
| EnergySolutions Arena17,595
| 26–44
|- style="background:#fcc;"
| 71
| March 26
| Cleveland
| 
| Josh Smith (24)
| Andre Drummond (11)
| Brandon Jennings (13)
| Palace of Auburn Hills15,979
| 26–45
|- style="background:#fcc;"
| 72 
| March 28
| Miami
| 
| Monroe & Bynum (12)
| Andre Drummond (14)
| Brandon Jennings (7)
| Palace of Auburn Hills21,231
| 26–46
|- style="background:#fcc;"
| 73
| March 29
| @ Philadelphia
| 
| Greg Monroe (20)
| Greg Monroe (10)
| Stuckey & Siva (4)
| Wells Fargo Center17,438
| 26–47
|- style="background:#cfc;"
| 74
| March 31
| Milwaukee
| 
| Greg Monroe (28)
| Andre Drummond (16)
| Brandon Jennings (13)
| Palace of Auburn Hills13,062
| 27–47

|- style="background:#fcc;"
| 75 
| April 2
| @ Indiana
| 
| Josh Smith (24)
| Greg Monroe (16)
| Brandon Jennings (9)
| Bankers Life Fieldhouse18,165
| 27–48
|- style="background:#fcc;"
| 76 
| April 4
| @ Brooklyn
| 
| Andre Drummond (23)
| Andre Drummond (18)
| Brandon Jennings (5)
| Barclays Center16,754
| 27–49
|- style="background:#cfc;"
| 77
| April 5
| Boston
| 
| Rodney Stuckey (26)
| Andre Drummond (20)
| Peyton Siva (5)
| Palace of Auburn Hills19,558
| 28–49
|- style="background:#cfc;"
| 78
| April 8
| @ Atlanta
| 
| Rodney Stuckey (29)
| Andre Drummond (17)
| Brandon Jennings (6)
| Philips Arena10,587
| 29–49
|- style="background:#fcc;"
| 79
| April 9
| @ Cleveland
| 
| Jennings & Jerebko (17)
| Andre Drummond (14)
| Brandon Jennings (7)
| Quicken Loans Arena15,979
| 29–50
|- style="background:#fcc;"
| 80
| April 11
| @ Chicago
| 
| Andre Drummond (26)
| Andre Drummond (26)
| Monroe, Jennings & Jerebko (3)
| United Center22,219
| 29–51
|- style="background:#fcc;"
| 81
| April 13
| Toronto
| 
| Greg Monroe (23)
| Andre Drummond (17)
| Brandon Jennings (7)
| Palace of Auburn Hills16,944
| 29–52
|- style="background:#fcc;"
| 82
| April 16
| @ Oklahoma City
| 
| Kentavious Caldwell-Pope (30)
| Andre Drummond (13)
| Greg Monroe (9)
| Chesapeake Energy Arena18,203
| 29–53

Standings

Player statistics

Season

|- align="center" bgcolor=""
| 
| 77 || 76 || style="background:#eb003c;color:white;" |35.5 || .419 || .264 || .532 || 6.8 || 3.3 ||style="background:#eb003c;color:white;" |1.36 || 1.43 ||style="background:#eb003c;color:white;" |16.4
|- align="center" bgcolor="f0f0f0"
| 
| 80 || 79 || 34.1 || .373 || .337 || .751 || 3.1 ||style="background:#eb003c;color:white;" |7.6 || 1.26 || .10 || 15.5
|- align="center" bgcolor=""
| 
|style="background:#eb003c;color:white;" |82 || style="background:#eb003c;color:white;" |82 || 32.8 || .497 || .000 || .657 || 9.3 || 2.1 || 1.11 || .57 || 15.2
|- align="center" bgcolor="f0f0f0"
| 
| 73 || 5 || 26.7 || .436 || .273 || style="background:#eb003c;color:white;" |.836 || 2.3 || 2.1 || .74 || .14 || 13.9
|- align="center" bgcolor=""
| 
| 81 || 81 || 32.3 || style="background:#eb003c;color:white;" |.623 || .000 || .418 || style="background:#eb003c;color:white;" | 13.2 || .4 || 1.25 || style="background:#eb003c;color:white;" |1.62 || 13.5
|- align="center" bgcolor="f0f0f0"
| 
|style="background:#eb003c;color:white;" |82 || 36 || 28.5 || .447 || .382 || .826 || 3.7 || .9 || .74 || .46 || 9.6
|- align="center" bgcolor=""
| 
| 56 || 3 || 18.8 || .428 || .323 || .802 || 1.8 || 3.9 || .70 || .13 || 8.7
|- align="center" bgcolor="f0f0f0"
| 
| 80 || 41 || 19.8 || .396 || .319 || .770 || 2.0 || .7 || .94 || .15 || 5.9
|- align="center" bgcolor=""
| 
| 20 || 0 || 9.0 || .380 || .250 || .571 || 1.7 || .3 || .20 || .25 || 4.6
|- align="center" bgcolor="f0f0f0"
| 
| 64 || 0 || 11.6 || .471 || .419 || .729 || 2.7 || .6 || .33 || .09 || 4.2
|- align="center" bgcolor=""
| 
| 19 || 7 || 16.3 || .304 || .292 || .833 || 1.5 || 2.2 || .42 || .05 || 3.8
|- align="center" bgcolor="f0f0f0"
| 
| 32 || 0 || 9.9 || .463 || .387 || .714 || 2.4 || .5 || .19 || .47 || 2.9
|- align="center" bgcolor=""
| 
| 34 || 0 || 7.0 || .351 || .179 || .800 || 1.4 || .3 || .18 || .03 || 2.4
|- align="center" bgcolor="f0f0f0"
| 
| 24 || 0 || 9.3 || .316 || .280 || .733 || .60 || 1.4 || .38 || .04 || 2.3
|- align="center" bgcolor=""
| 
| 21 || 0 || 3.8 || .417 || style="background:#eb003c;color:white;" |1.000''' || .579 || 1.20 || .1 || .29 || .14 || 1.0
|}

Transactions

Overview

Trades

Free agents

References

Detroit Pistons seasons
Detroit Pistons
Detroit
Detroit